A food museum tells the story of what sustains humankind. Such museums may be specifically focused on one plant, as is the Saffron Museum in Boynes, France. They may explore a food made from a plant, for example, The Bread Museum in Ulm, Germany; a product such as the National Mustard Museum in Wisconsin; the art of food displayed at California's Copia; or historic farms, for example, Iowa's Living History Farms.

In some cases, food museums focus on how and what the world eats. Agropolis in Montpellier, France does this, as does Nestle Foundation's Alimentarium, in Vevey, Switzerland. Japan's Ramen Museum is an innovative food museum in the form of a shopping arcade featuring different noodle restaurants and displays on ramen history.

Food museums are a part of the emerging food heritage movement.

See also

 List of food and beverage museums

External links
Directory of Food and Beverage Museums and Collections
NY Food Museum, New York, USA
Southern Food & Beverage Museum, New Orleans, USA
Museums about Food & Eating
All about history of cooking and food preparation, Prague, Czech Republic
 

Types of museums